This is a list of women artists who were born in England or whose works are closely associated with that country.

A
Evelyn Abelson (1886–1967), painter
Ruth Abrahams (1931–2000), painter, illustrator
Judith Ackland (1892–1971), landscape painter
Elinor Proby Adams (1885–1945), painter
Sarah Gough Adamson (1888–1963), painter
Edith Helena Adie (1865–1947), painter
Marion Adnams (1898–1995), painter, printmaker, and draughtswoman
Mary Adshead (1904–1995), painter, illustrator, designer
Eileen Agar (1899–1991), painter and photographer
Sam Ainsley (born 1950), painter and tapestry artist
Pauline Aitken (1893–1958), sculptor
Eileen Aldridge (1916–1990), painter
Griselda Allan (1905–1987), painter
Rosemary Allan (1911–2008), painter
Daphne Allen (1899–1985), painter
Kathleen Allen (1906–1983), painter
Helen Allingham (1848–1926), watercolourist, illustrator
Anna Alma-Tadema (1867–1943), painter
Laura Theresa Alma-Tadema (1852–1909), painter
Athene Andrade (1908–1973), painter 
Edith Alice Andrews (1873–1958), painter, illustrator
Lilian Andrews (1878–c.1962), painter
Marie Angel (1923–2010), painter, illustrator
Beatrice Angle (1859–1915), sculptor
Mabel Annesley (1881–1959), engraver, painter
Amanda Ansell (born 1976), painter
Norah Ansell (1906–1990), sculptor
Mary Anne Ansley (fl. 1810–1840), painter
Anne Margaret Coke, Viscountess Anson (1779–1843), painter
Rachel Ara (born 1965), conceptual and data artist
Phyllis Archibald (1880–1947), sculptor
Janet Archer (fl. 1873–1916), painter
Val Archer (born 1946), painter
Ann Arnold (1936–2015), painter 
Sue Arrowsmith (1950–2014), contemporary artist
Pamela Ascherson (1923–2010), sculptor, illustrator
Felicity Askew (born 1899), sculptor
Sophie Aston (born 1970), painter
Sophie Atkinson (1876–1972), painter, illustrator
Mary Audsley (1919–2008), painter, sculptor
Winifred Austen (1876–1964), painter
Gillian Ayres (1930–2018), painter, printmaker

B
Roma Babuniak (born 1952), ceramicist
Margaret Backhouse (1818–1888), portrait painter
Marjorie May Bacon (1902–1988), painter, printmaker 
Blanche Baker (1844–1929), painter
Gladys Baker (1889–1974), painter
Barbara Banister (1895–1984), painter, silversmith
Lesley Banks (born 1962), painter
Fiona Banner (born 1966), contemporary artist
Audrey Barker (1932–2002), installation artist 
Lucette Barker (1816–1905), painter
Gwen Barnard (1912–1988), painter, printmaker
Mary Baylis Barnard (1870–1946), painter
Angela Barrett (born 1955), illustrator and painter
Anna Barriball (born 1972), mixed media artist
Lindsay Bartholomew (born 1944), watercolour painter
Edith Bateson (1867–1938), painter, sculptor
Pauline Baumann (1899–1977), painter, printmaker
Margaret Beale (1886–1969), marine artist
Mary Beale (1633–1699), portrait painter
Sophia Beale (1837–1920), painter 
Nicola Bealing (born 1963), painter
Celia Frances Bedford (1904–1959), painter, printmaker
Sarah Beddington (born 1964), artist, filmmaker
Gladys Kathleen Bell (1882–1965), miniatures painter
Jeanne Bell (1888–1978), sculptor
Vanessa Bell (1879–1961), painter, interior designer
Eleanor Best (1875–1957), painter
Joyce Bidder (1906–1999), sculptor
Clara Billing (1881–1963), sculptor, painter
Helen Binyon (1904–1979), illustrator 
Suzzan Blac (born 1960), surreal painter
Mary Black (c.1737–1814), portrait painter
Vivien Blackett (born 1955), painter
Audrey Blackman (1907–1990), sculptor, potter
Eileen Blake (1878–1957), painter 
Zelma Blakely (1921–1978), illustrator
Flavia Blois (1914–1980), landscape painter
Margaret Blundell (1907–1996), painter, illustrator
Anna Blunden (1829–1915), painter
Barbara Bodichon (1827–1891), artist
Deirdre Borlase (1925–2018), painter 
Daisy Theresa Borne (1906–1998), sculptor
Doris Boulton-Maude (1892–1961), painter and printmaker
Georgina Bowers (1836–1912), illustrator
Eden Box (1919–1988), painter 
Dorothea Braby (1909–1987), illustrator
Dorothy Bradford (artist) (1918–2008), painter 
Dorothy Elizabeth Bradford (1897–1986), painter 
Constance Bradshaw (1872–1961), landscapist
Phyllis Bray (1911–1991), artist and muralist
Rosa Brett (1829–1882), Pre-Raphaelite painter 
Denise Broadley (1913–2007), painter
Iris Brooke (1905–c.1967), illustrator and author
Irene Mary Browne, (1881–1977), sculptor and potter
Marjorie Frances Bruford (1902–1958), painter
Olivia Mary Bryden (1883–1951), painter
Evelyne Oughtred Buchanan (1883–1979), painter
Eliza Mary Burgess (1878–1961), painter
Averil Burleigh (1883–1949), painter
Louie Burrell (1873–1971), painter
Dorothy Burroughes (1883–1963), illustrator
Lady Elizabeth Butler (Elizabeth Thompson) (1846–1933), painter
Mildred Anne Butler (1858–1941), painter
Caroline Byng Lucas (1886–1967), painter and printer
Anne Frances Byrne (1775–1837), flower painter
Fanny Byse (1849–?), sculptor

C
Florence Callcott (1866–1936), sculptor
Helen Cammock (born 1970), photographer, poet
Estella Campavias (1918–1990), ceramicist, sculptor
Felicity Campbell (1909–?), painter and illustrator
Louisa Starr Canziani (1845–1909), painter 
Nancy Carline (1909–2004), landscape painter
Margaret Sarah Carpenter (1793–1872), portrait painter
Edith Carr (1875–1949), painter 
Joanna Carrington (1931–2003), painter
Florence Castle (1867–1959), painter, illustrator
Tamsyn Challenger, contemporary artist
Eileen Chandler (1904–1993), portrait painter
Alice Chaplin (1848–1921), sculptor
Daphne Charlton (1909–1991), painter 
Felicity Charlton (1913–2009), painter
Evelyn Cheston (1875–1929), landscape painter
Milly Childers (1866–1922), painter
Helen Clapcott (born 1952), painter
Jean Clark (1902–1999), watercolour painter and muralist 
Bethia Clarke (1867–1959), painter
Dora Clarke (1895–1989), sculptor
Freda Coleborn (1911–1965), glass artist
Shelagh Cluett (1947–2007), sculptor
Helen Mary Coaton (1911–2005), sculptor
Hilary Dulcie Cobbett (1885–1976), painter
Isabel Codrington (1874–1943), painter
Ellen Gertrude Cohen (1846–?), illustrator
Dorothy Coke (1897–1979), painter
Elsie Vera Cole (1885–1967), painter
Ruth Collet (1909–2001), painter
Susan Collier (1938–2011), textile designer
Elisabeth Collins (1904–2000), painter and sculptor
Ithell Colquhoun (1906–1988), painter, occultist and author
Joanna Constantinidis (1927–2000), potter, ceramist
Alice May Cook (1876–1960), painter, illustrator
Beryl Cook (1926–2008), painter
May Louise Greville Cooksey (1878–1943), painter
Jessica Cooper (born 1967), painter and designer
Constance Copeman (1864–1953), painter
Teresa Copnall (1882–1972), painter
Edith Corbet (1846–1920), painter
Emma Cousin (born 1986), painter
Dorothy Cox (1882–1947), painter
Doris Crane (1911–1999), sculptor
Frances Crawshaw (1876–1968), painter
Emily Grace Creswell (1889–1931), painter
Fiona Crisp (born 1966), photographer, installation artist
Barbara Crocker (1910–1995), painter, author
Stella Rebecca Crofts (1898–1964), sculptor and potter
Joan Crossley-Holland (1912–2005), gallery owner, potter
Lizzie Mary Cullen, designer
Nora Cundell (1889–1948), painter
Esmé Currey (1881–1973), painter, etcher
Mary Henrietta Dering Curtois (1854–1929), painter

D
Edith Mary Davey (1867–1953), painter
Mary Davis (1866–1941), painter
Gladys Dawson (1909–1993), painter, illustrator
Frances Sally Day (1816–1892), painter, photographer
Evelyn De Morgan (1855–1919), painter
Jane Mary Dealy (1856–1939), painter
Alison Debenham (1903–1967), painter
Elise D'Elboux (1870–1956), painter, illustrator
Christabel Dennison (1884–1924), painter, sculptor 
Joyce Dennys (1893–1991), cartoonist, illustrator and painter.
Brigid Derham (1943–1980), painter
Evangeline Dickson (1922–2004), painter
Grace Digby (1895–1964), painter
Eve Disher (1894–1991), painter
Mary Dobson (born 1912), painter, illustrator
Mary Donington (1909–1987), sculptor
Barbara Dorf (1933–2016), painter
Jane Dowling (1925–2023), painter
Edith Downing (1857–1931), sculptor
Marjorie Drawbell (1903–2000), sculptor, potter
Violet Dreschfeld (1890–1975), sculptor
Pamela Drew (1910–1989), painter of marine and aviation subjects 
Yvonne Drewry (1918–2007), painter and printmaker
Lilian Dring (1908–1998), textile artist
Mary Elizabeth Duffield-Rosenberg (1819–1914), painter
Evelyn Dunbar (1906–1960), painter, illustrator
Susan Durant (1827–1873), sculptor

E
Aileen Eagleton (1902–1984), painter
Ursula Edgcumbe (1900–1985), sculptor and painter
Edith Edmonds (1874–1951), painter
May de Montravel Edwardes (1887–1967), painter
Helen Edwards (1882–1963), landscape painter
Mildred Eldridge (1909–1991), painter
Aileen Mary Elliott (1896–1966), marine artist
Eleanor Joan Ellis (1904–1989), painter, woodcut artist
Rosemary Ellis (1910–1998), painter, illustrator
Tracey Emin (born 1963), multidisciplinary artist
Rosalie Emslie (1891–1977), painter
Nora England (1887–1970), painter
Cicely Englefield (1893–1970), illustrator and author
Grace English (1891–1956), painter

F
Frances C. Fairman (1839–1923), painter
Leila Faithfull (1896–1994), painter 
Julia Farrer (born 1950), abstract painter
Daphne Fedarb (1912–1992), painter
Mary Fedden (1915–2012), painter
Magdalen Feline (died 1796), silversmith
Hilda Fearon (1878–1917), painter
Dee Ferris (born 1973), painter
Celia Fiennes (1902–1998), printmaker, painter
Myrta Fisher (1917–1999), painter
Margaret Fitton (1902–1988), artist
Victorine Foot (1920–2000), artist 
Elizabeth Forbes (1859–1912), painting
Mollie Forestier-Walker (1912–1990), portrait painter
Agnes Freda Forres (c.1880–1942), sculptor
Eleanor Fortescue-Brickdale (1872–1945), artist, illustrator
Marcia Lane Foster (1897–1983), painter and book illustrator
Mary Fox (1922–2005), painter
Cherryl Fountain (born 1950), painter
Elizabeth Bertha Fraser (born 1914), sculptor
Violet Fuller (1920–2006), painter

G
Alexandra Gallagher (born 1980), multidisciplinary artist
Margaret Garland (1893–1976), painter
Rose Garrard (born 1946), multidisciplinary artist, writer
Alethea Garstin (1894–1978), painter
Margaret Geddes (1914–1998), painter
Kaff Gerrard (1894–1970), painter, potter
Jean Gibson (1927–1991), sculptor
Margaret Giles (1868–1949), sculptor
Phyllis Ginger (1907–2005), painter, illustrator
Edith Gittins (1845–1910), painter
Elsie Gledstanes (1891–1982), painter
Sybil Mullen Glover (1908–1995), landscape painter
Maude Goodman (Matilda Scanes) (1853–1938), painter
Hilda May Gordon (1874–1972), painter
Sylvia Gosse (1881–1968), painter and printmaker
Caroline Gotch (1854–1945), painter
Mary Gow (1851–1929), painter
Alice Kirkby Goyder (1875–1964), painter, etcher
Mary Grant (1831–1908), sculptor
Kate Greenaway (1846–1901), illustrator
Barbara Greg (1900–1983), wood engraver
Christine Gregory (1879–1963), sculptor
Eleanor Gribble (1883–1960), painter, designer
Mary Elizabeth Groom (1903–1958), illustrator, printmaker
Kate Groobey (born 1979), painter
Lucy Gunning (born 1964), filmmaker, installation artist, sculptor, video artist 
Kathleen Guthrie (1905–1981), painter, illustrator
Edna Guy (artist) (1897–1969), painter
 Sophie Green (born 1992)

H
Maria C. Hakewill (died 1842), portrait painter
Roxana Halls (born 1974), painter
Emmeline Halse (1853–1930), sculptor
Maggi Hambling (born 1945), painter, sculptor
Gertrude Harvey (1879–1966), painter 
Lucy Harwood (1893–1972), painter
Isobel Heath (1908–1989), painter
Elsie Henderson (1880–1967), painter, sculptor
Sarah Hengler (c.1765–1845), firework artist
Rose Henriques (1889–1972), painter 
Barbara Hepworth (1903–1975), painter, sculptor
Gertrude Hermes (1901–1983), engraver
Elsie Dalton Hewland (1901–1979), painter
Cicely Hey (1896–1980), painter, sculptor
Eileen Hickman-Smith (1909–1970), sculptor
Wuon-Gean Ho (born 1973), printmaker
Mary Hoare (1744–1820), painter
Sarah Holaday (died 1754), silversmith
Edith Holden (1871–1920), painter, writer
Ruth Hollingsworth (1880–1945), painter
Gwynneth Holt (1909–1995), ivory sculptor
Claire Hooper (born 1979), painter, video artist
Nancy Horrocks (1900–1989), abstract painter
Kathleen Horsman (1911–1998), potter
Evelyn Houghton (1908–1983), painter
Erlund Hudson (1912–2011), watercolour painter and etcher
Georgina Hunt (1912–2012), abstract artist

I
Diane Ibbotson (born 1946), painter
Marjorie Incledon (1891–1973), painter, stained glass artist
Judy Inglis (1952–2003), painter
Alice Instone (born 1975), painter

J
Muriel Amy Jackson (1902–1989), illustrator
Kathleen Jebb (1879–1957), painter, engraver
Blanche Jenkins (active 1872–1915), painter
Chantal Joffe (born 1969), painter
Vivien John (1915–1994), painter
Esther Borough Johnson (1866–1958), painter
Gwyneth Johnstone (1915–2010), painter
Jean Jones (1927–2012), painter
Lucy Jones (born 1955), painter
Louise Jopling (1843–1933), painter
Lily Delissa Joseph (1863–1940), painter

K
Marion Kalmus (born 1962), mixed media artist
Helen Kapp (1901–1978), painter, curator
Angelica Kauffman (1741–1807), painter
Edith Kemp-Welch (1870–1941), painter
Lucy Kemp-Welch (1869–1958), equine artist
Alice Kettle (born 1961), textile artist
Sarah Louisa Kilpack (1839–1909), painter
Dorothy King (1907–1990), painter
Margaret King (active 1779–87), painter
Eve Kirk (1900–1969), painter
Myfanwy Kitchin (1917–2002), painter, ceramicist
Laura Knight (1877–1970), painter, printmaker
Madge Knight (1895–1974), abstract painter
Winifred Knights (1899–1947), painter

L
Jessica Landseer (1810–1880), landscape painter, miniaturist 
Edith Lawrence (1890–1973), printmaker
Sheila Lea (1901–1992), sculptor
Molly Le Bas (1903–1996), sculptor
Erica Lee (1888–1981), sculptor
Eliza Anne Leslie-Melville (1829-1919), painter
Alice Lindley-Millican (1885–1930), sculptor
Harriet Lisle (1717–1794), painter
Beatrice Ethel Lithiby (1889–1966), painter
Elizabeth Jane Lloyd (1928–1995), painter and teacher
Dorothy Lockwood (1910–1991), painter
Marie Seymour Lucas (1855–1921), painter
Sarah Lucas (born 1962), contemporary artist

M
Frances Macdonald (1914–2002), painter
Jessie Macgregor (1847–1919), painter
Nicolette Macnamara (1911–1987), painter, writer
Edna Mann (1926–1985), painter
Violet Manners (1856–1937), painter
Madeline Marrable (1833–1916), painter
Maria Marshall (born 1966), visual artist
Freda Marston (1895–1949), painter 
Edith Martineau (1842–1909), painter
Anna Mazzotta (born 1970), painter
Daphne McClure (born 1930), painter 
Mary McCrossan (1865–1934), painter
Mary McEvoy, (1870–1941), painter
Dorothy Mead (1928–1975), painter
Hilary Miller (1919–1993), painter, illustrator
Maggie Mitchell (1883–1953), sculptor
Victoria Monkhouse (1883–1970), painter
Clara Montalba (1840–1929), painter
Ellen Montalba (1842–1912), painter
Henrietta Montalba (1848–1893), sculptor
Hilda Montalba (1846–1919), painter, sculptor
Esther Moore (1857–1934), sculptor, designer
Mona Moore (1917–2000), painter, illustrator
Mary Moser (1744–1819), painter
Marlow Moss (1889–1958), painter, sculptor
Olive Mudie-Cooke (1890–1925), painter
Annie Feray Mutrie (1826–1893), painter
Martha Darley Mutrie (1824–1885), painter

N
Isabel Naftel (1832–1912), landscape and genre painter
Irene Newton (1915–1992), textile designer
Catherine Maude Nichols (1847–1923), painter
Margaret Graeme Niven (1906–1997), painter
Marianne North (1830–1890), flower painter
Krysia Nowak (born 1948), painter, mixed-media artist

O
Emma Oliver (1819–1885), landscape painter
Madge Oliver (1875–1924), painter
Emily Mary Osborn (1828–1925), painter

P
Grace Pailthorpe (1883–1971), painter
Kathleen Parbury (1901–1986), sculptor
Constance-Anne Parker (1921–2016), sculptor
Lilian Parker (1874–1947), sculptor, painter
Janette Parris (born 1963)
Florence Pash (1860–1951), painter
Enid Peate (1883–1954), painter
Margot Perryman (born 1938)
Kate Perugini (1839–1929), painter
Rosemary Peto (1916–1998), painter
Louise Pickard (1865–1928), painter
Dulcie Mary Pillers (1891–1961), medical illustrator
Pinwill sisters (born 1870s), woodcarvers
Orovida Camille Pissarro (1893–1968), painter, etcher
Primrose Pitman (1902–1998), painter
Maria Pixell (died 1811) painter
Elizabeth Polunin (1887–1950), artist, theatre designer
Fay Pomerance (1912–2001), painter
Melinda Camber Porter (1953–2008), painter, writer 
Beatrix Potter (1866–1943), painter, writer
Jasmine Pradissitto (born 1966), painter, sculptor
Margaret Fisher Prout (1875–1963), painter
Brenda Pye (1907–2005), painter

R
Henrietta Rae (1859–1928), painter
Mary Ramsden (born 1984), painter
Alma Ramsey (1907–1993), sculptor
Lilian Rathmell (1909–2000), painter, fabric artist
Gwen Raverat (1885–1957), engraver
Ruth Raymond (1897–1986), calligrapher, weaver
Louise Rayner (1832–1924), watercolourist
Rachel Reckitt (1908–1995), sculptor, engraver
Daphne Reynolds (1918–2002), printmaker, painter
Flora Macdonald Reid (1861–1938), painter 
Mary Remington (1910–2003), painter
Lady Mary Rennell (1901–1981), painter
Harriet Riddell (born 1990), textile artist 
Anna Ridler (born 1985), artificial intelligence artist 
Bridget Riley (born 1931), painter
Ruth Rix (born 1942), painter, multidisciplinary artist
Phyllis Roberts (born 1916), painter, sculptor
Ellen Mary Rope (1855–1934), sculptor
Ellis Rowan (1848–1922), illustrator
Anne Rushout (c.1767–1849), watercolorist 
Rosemary Rutherford (1912–1972), painter, stained glass artist
Margaret Ryder (1908–1998), painter
Adolfine Mary Ryland (1903–1983), sculptor

S
Anne Said (1914–1995), artist
Emily Sarah, painter
Stella Schmolle (1908–1975), painter
Pamela Scott Wilkie (born 1937), painter, printmaker
Dorothea Sharp (1874–1955), painter
Alice Sheene, silversmith
Clare Shenstone (born 1948), portrait painter
Tai Shani (born 1976), performance artist
Elizabeth Siddal (1829–1862), artist
Emma Sillett (1802–1880), flower painter
Corinne Silva (born 1976), contemporary artist
Hilary Simon, silk painter
Ruth Simpson (1889–1964), portrait painter
Vikki Slowe (born 1947), printmaker and painter
Mary Smirke (1779–1853), painter
May Aimée Smith (1886–1962), painter
Pamela Colman Smith (1878–1951), illustrator and painter
Jean Spencer (1942–1998), abstract artist
Maria Spilsbury (1776–1820), religious painter
A. B. S. Sprigge (1906–1980), sculptor
Zita Stead (1904–1986), medical illustrator
Florence Steele (1857–1948), sculptor, designer
Elsie Stevens (1907–?), painter
Carole Steyn (born 1938), abstract painter
Marie Spartali Stillman (1844–1927), painter
Marianne Stokes (1855–1927), painter
Sarah Stone (1760–1844), natural history artist
Helen Stratton (1867–1961), book illustrator
Linda Sutton (born 1947), painter
Annie Swynnerton (1844–1933), painter

T
Emma Talbot (born 1969), painter
Agnes Clara Tatham (1893–1972), painter
Barbara Austin Taylor (1891–1951), sculptor
Shirley Teed (1933–2018), painter
Hilda Theobald (1901–1985), sculptor
Valerie Thornton (1931–1991), etcher, printmaker
Helen Thornycroft (1848–1937), painter
Flora Twort (1893–1985), painter, pastellist
Mary Fraser Tytler (1849–1938), painter, ceramicist

V
Gladys Vasey (1889–1981), portrait painter
Elisabeth Vellacott (1905–2002), painter
Dorothy Venning (1885–1942), sculptor
Angela Verren (born 1930), painter
Charlotte Verity, (born 1954), painter
Stella Vine (born 1969), painter

W
Lillian Wade (1870–1923), sculptor
Josephine Wall (born 1947), painter, sculptor
Mary Lemon Waller (1851–1931), painter
Audrey Walker (1928–2020), textile artist
Hilda Annetta Walker (1877–1960), sculptor and painter
Winifred Walker (1882–1965), botanical artist
Kathleen Walne (1915–2011), watercolour painter
Joan Warburton (1920–1996), painter
Henrietta Ward (1832–1924), genre painter
Billie Waters (1896–1979), painter
Mary Spencer Watson (1913–2006), sculptor
Maud Marian Wear (1873–1955), painter
Cecilia Webb (1888–1957), sculptor
Kate Westrup (1885–1928), animal painter, potter
Edith Grace Wheatley (1888–1970), painter
Erica White (1904–1991), sculptor
Rachel Whiteread (born 1963), sculptor
Mandy Wilkinson (born 1970), painter
Caroline Fanny Williams (1836–1921), landscape painter
Faith Winter (1927–2017), sculptor
Ursula Wood (1868–1925), painter
Gertrude Mary Woodward (1854–1939), scientific illustrator
Meg Woolf (born 1923), painter, sculptor
Rose Wylie (born 1934), painter

Y
Nan Youngman (1906–1995), painter

Z
Georgiana Zornlin (1800–1881), painter
Astrid Zydower (1930–2005), sculptor

Artists, women

Artists
English